Niagara United FC is a Canadian soccer team founded in 1973. The club is a former member of the Canadian Soccer League (CSL), where it fielded a professional team from 2011-2015, and now operates youth teams in the Niagara Soccer League. The team plays its home games in Kalar Sports Park in Niagara Falls, Ontario. In 2011, the club joined the CSL and played in the CSL Second Division. After a successful debut season Niagara was promoted to the First Division, and qualified for the playoffs in their first season in the top flight. The following season the club went through a rebuilding stage focusing on developing and recruiting local players. In 2016, Niagara announced its departure from the league.

History

Niagara United Football Club were formed in 1973 as a non-profit organization. In 2011, Niagara United were elevated to the professional ranks by joining the Canadian Soccer League, and competed in the CSL Second Division. Former St. Catharines Wolves head coach James McGillivray was appointed for the role of head coach. Niagara debuted in the Canadian Soccer League on May 14, 2011, drawing their first away game against the York Region Shooters B team 2-2. The team played their first home game against Toronto FC Academy on May 21, 2011. In their debut season the club clinched the Western Division title, and reached the semi-finals of the postseason. At the conclusion of the season McGillivary won the Coach of the Year award, and the Fair Play and Respect award. Niagara United hosted a friendly match against Bedlington Terriers FC, then playing in the English Northern Football League,  on June 28, 2011, losing 4-1.

On April 3, 2012 the CSL announced the promotion of Niagara to the CSL First Division. Kalar Sports Park the team's home ground received several grants in order to accommodate the facility for CSL standards. McGillivray maintained the majority of his veterans from the previous season with the addition of American imports with PDL experience. Niagara made their professional debut on May 26, 2012 in a sellout crowd against Brantford Galaxy in a 2-1 defeat with Derek Paterson scoring the lone goal. In their debut season in the First Division the team clinched the final playoff berth. Their opponents in the quarterfinals were Toronto Croatia, but suffered a 2-0 defeat. For the second year in a row McGillivary received the D2 Coach of the Year award while Malcolm Mings won the Defender of the Year award.

For the 2013 season McGillivary re-signed the majority of his players with notable additions as Liberian international Preston Corporal, Keith Makubuya, and Gary Boughton. The season marked the first time the organization tasted failure as it finished at the bottom of the overall standings. In 2014, MacGillivary relinquished his head coach responsibilities to Bruno Reis. The season was marked with injuries, shortage of talent, and a lack of player commitment which resulted once more in a last place finish in the overall standings.

In 2015, Niagara hired the services of David Currie to coach the squad. For the 2015 season the organization applied a new philosophy where they would focus on recruiting local players from the Niagara region. The season marked a rebuilding stage within the franchise as Niagara finished for the third straight year at the bottom of the rankings. On October 4, 2015, Niagara was involved in a controversial match against SC Waterloo, where there was suspicion of match fixing on Waterloo's part which resulted in the match to be abandoned at the 65th minute. It was announced on April 3, 2016 that Niagara United will not return for the 2016 season.

Final Coaching staff

Head coaches

Year-by-year

Old logo

See also
 Canadian Soccer League
 Canadian soccer pyramid

References

External links
 

Canadian Soccer League (1998–present) teams
Sport in Niagara Falls, Ontario
Soccer clubs in Ontario
Association football clubs established in 1973
1973 establishments in Ontario